Alexei Shulgin (born 1963 in Moscow) is a Russian born contemporary artist, musician, and online curator. Working out of Moscow and Helsinki, Shulgin established the Immediate Photography Group in 1988 and started his career in this area of study. After 1990, he shifted his interests from photography to the Internet, and consequently, in 1994, founded Moscow-WWW-Art-Lab WWW Art Lab, collaborating with many artists from London and Slovenia. That very same year, the artist created an online photo museum called "Hot Pictures". In 1997, Shulgin continued with the invention of Form Art (Form Art), and later that year the introduction of the Easy Life website (Easy Life). In 1999, Shulgin became Webmaster at FUFME, Inc. Since 2004, Shulgin has been a co-owner of Electroboutique (Electroboutique).

Highlights
Particularly involved with software art and internet art, he is a part of the readme culture and uses code as a form of art. In 1997, he released his first interactive work, Form Art, in which only minimum factors are programmed in the form of HTML. Navigating this site requires aimless click-throughs of blank boxes and links, which lead the viewer through 19 pages of "form art" animations. Behavioral expectations are subverted by frequently overriding default functionality of basic form elements such as radio buttons and list boxes.

Shulgin is probably most well known for his ongoing so called "386DX" performances, in which he manipulates an antiquated computer with Microsoft Windows version 3.1 and an Intel 386 processor to perform MIDI (Musical Instrument Digital Interface) renditions of popular music hits while a synthesized text-to-speech voice "sings" the lyrics. Shulgin describes his project, which he began in 1998, of electronic covers as "the world's first cyberpunk rock band." Shulgin and his software have given live performances in many different locals all over the world, from the San Diego/Mexico border, with Shulgin on one side and his computer on the other, to the streets of Graz, Austria, where the machine was actually given money as if it were a real person for playing the music. Shulgin encourages his audience to also manipulate the early Microsoft software- with the self-release of his cover songs on an enhanced cd titled The Best of 386 DX, which included the same first version of Windows that he used, followed by the release of Biggest Smash Hits on the Staalplaat label.

Exhibitions
2012, Electroboutique, Requiem , Мультимедиа Арт Музей, Москва

References

Sources

External links
 easylife.org website
 https://web.archive.org/web/20080419014508/http://pzwart.wdka.hro.nl/mdr/research/ashulgin/
 https://wiki.brown.edu/confluence/display/MarkTribe/Alexei+Shulgin
 https://web.archive.org/web/20080501082440/http://sunsite.cs.msu.su/wwwart/
Thomas Dreher: History of Computer Art, chap. VI.3.2 HTML Art  with a wider explanation of Alexei Shulgin's "Form Art" (1997).

Net.artists
1963 births
Living people
Russian artists
Digital artists
Kandinsky Prize